Seven Hills of Shimla are the seven hills in Shimla, the capital and the largest city of the North Indian state of Himachal Pradesh. It has been the summer capital of British India. Shimla city is developed on the Seven Hills. Although today Shimla has even spread oust the seven hills but the main Shimla lies on the seven hills only.

Seven Hills 
Jakhu Hill:Jakhu Hill is the first hill of Shimla. It is the highest hill of Shimla, located at the high attitude of the 8048 feet from sea level, and the most famous hill of Shimla. The hill is the part of the central Shimla and is crowned by the temple dedicated to Lord Hanuman Jakhu Temple and a statue in its premises i.e. Shri Hanuman Jakhu. The hill is secured with Alpine trees. The hill is also infamous for its mischievous monkeys.
Bantony Hill:Bantony Hill holds the central Shimla. Kali Bari Temple and Bantony Castle are the two major landmarks located on the top of it. The hill is named after Lord Bantony. One of the most important suburbs and places of Shimla, Kaithu and Annadale, is located on the southern-most part of the hill.
Inveram Hill: Inveram Hill holds the one of the most important parts of the city. On the top of it Chaura Maidan area where State Museum, Bird Museum and Himachal Pradesh Vidhan Sabha is located. The height of the hill is 2445 feet from the sea level. Glen forest is located in the bottom part of the hill, which covers half of the area of Annadale. 
Observatory Hill: Observatory Hill also holds the western Shimla. The height of the hill has the high attitude of 7050 feet from the sea level. On the top of it Indian Institute of Advanced Study is located. The working in which the foundation is set up is a noteworthy royal residence that was worked by Lord Dufferin, who was the Viceroy of India from 1884– 1888. Erstwhile called the Viceregal Lodge is today the Rashtrapati Bhawan and in addition the Institute of Advanced Studies. Most parts of the establishment are shut for an open public, anyway whatever is left of the immaculate structure is open and drives in a major number of sightseers to the place.

 Prospect Hill: Prospect Hill is located at the high attitude of 2200 meters, from the sea level, in western Shimla. It has the Kamna Devi temple on the top of it. The slope is a valued place for in Shimla, as it is mainstream for having an exceptionally celebrated sanctuary committed to Goddess Kamna Devi.
Summer Hill: Summer Hill is located at the high attitude of 6500 feet above the sea level. It holds the western Shimla. On the top of it the campus of the Himachal Pradesh University is located. Summer Hill is a pleasant spot on Kalka-Shimla railroad line that offers stunning perspectives of the snowy mountains. Summer Hill is a similar place where Mahatma Gandhi had visited and remained at the exquisite Georgian House of Rajkumari Amrit Kaur.
 Elysium Hill: Elysium Hill is the seventh hill of Shimla. It holds the north-western Shimla. The height of the hill is 7400 feet from the sea level. It holds Auckland House and Longwood and reaches out towards the Bharari. This appealing site is situated out and about promoting the Lakkar Bazaar. The Auckland House, which was the home of Lord Baron Auckland, is situated here. As indicated by records, Lord Auckland bought this house in the year 1836, and it was changed over to a school, Auckland House School. Stirling Castle, found close by, is a halfway house which offers a refuge for poor Tibetan children. One of the major suburbs of Shimla, Kaithu's half region of Buchail area is located in the southern part of the hill, other half and main part of the suburb is located in Bantony Hill.

See also 
 List of cities claimed to be built on seven hills
 Seven Hills, Queensland

References 

Hills of Himachal Pradesh
Hill stations in Himachal Pradesh
Tourist attractions in Shimla